Ram Kumar Meena was an Indian politician. He was elected to the Lok Sabha, the lower house of the Parliament of India, from Sawai Madhopur in Rajasthan, as a member of the Indian National Congress.

References

External links
Official biographical sketch in Parliament of India website

India MPs 1980–1984
India MPs 1984–1989
Lok Sabha members from Rajasthan
Indian National Congress politicians
Living people
Year of birth missing (living people)